Algo cambió is a 2006 compilation album by Astrud, featuring B-sides and rarities from their output between the years 1995 and 2005, including cover versions of songs by The Magnetic Fields, Pulp and Family.

Track listing
 "Cambio de tiempo" – 3:52
 "Superman" – 3:22
 "Campeón" – 0:40
 "Mentalismo" – 3:50
 "No estaría mal no tener que saber que es lo que va a pasar" – 3:46
 "With Whom To Dance" – 2:50 The Magnetic Fields
 "El teclista telequinético" – 4:16
 "Last time" – 6:12
 "Los novios instantáneos" – 3:24
 "No tengo miedo" – 2:36
 "Cambio de forma" – 3:41
 "Todo es lounge (mi vida es Lynch)" – 4:10
 "Dévce Citronik" – 3:08
 "A mí me pasa lo mismo" – 3:47
 "El bello verano" – 0:42
 "Es que sí" – 2:34
 "Lemongirl" – 2:47
 "La boda" – 3:28
 "Vamos al amor" – 2:25
 "Chico del siglo XXI" – 1:08
 "Something Changed" – 2:47 Pulp
 "Normal" – 4:02
 "Romance sentimentale" – 3:06

2006 compilation albums
Astrud albums